Emma Dodd (born 1969) is an English author and illustrator. She is best known for her  children's books published by Orchard Books, Templar Publishing, Penguin Books, Macmillan Publishers (United States), Simon & Schuster, HarperCollins (US), Scholastic Corporation (US and UK) and Nosy Crow.

Biography 
Emma Dodd was born in 1969 in Guildford, Surrey, the daughter of designers Robert Dodd and Fay Hillier. She attended Tormead School, Kingston Polytechnic, where she did a Foundation Course in Art and Design, and then Central Saint Martins College of Art and Design, London graduating in graphic design and illustration in 1992.

During the early part of her career, Emma worked in advertising and editorial, for clients including Volvo, BMW, Pentagram (NYC and London), Royal Botanic Gardens (Kew), The Guardian, The Observer, Sunday Express and She Magazine.

At the same time, she began to illustrate children's books. Today, illustrating and writing children's picture books is the focus of Emma's career.

Emma Dodd illustrated the award-winning Amazing Baby series for Templar, was selected as a winner in the 2010 Booktrust Early Years Awards for I Love My Mummy, written by Giles Andreae (Purple Ronnie) and is nominated for the 2011 Kate Greenaway Medal for her book, I Love Bugs.

Emma Dodd lives in Surrey with her husband, two children and their dog Buzz.
Among Emma's favourite things in life are surfing with her kids, punctuality, red lipstick and Scrabble.

Bibliography 

2014

Foxy in Love HarperCollins 2014

I Love You Baby Orchard Books 2014

The Entertainer Templar Publishing May 2014

I Love Dogs re-issue Orchard Books 2014

I Love Cats re-issue Orchard Books 2014

2013

I Love you Father Christmas Orchard Books 2013

When You Were Born, Templar Publishing Nov 2013

Forever, Templar Publishing May 2013

Everything Templar Publishing 2013

Baby and Me Nosy Crow March 2013

I Love You Orchard Books 2013

Cinderelephant Templar Publishing 2013

2012

I Love Beasts Orchard Books 2012

Foxy HarperCollins 2012

As illustrator 

2011

I Love my Daddy, Orchard Books, written by Giles Andreae

Roman Rescue, Templar Publishing, written by K.A. Gerrard

2010

I Love my Mummy, 2010, Orchard Books, written by Giles Andreae

As author and illustrator 

2011

I Love All Beasts.... Great and Small Beasts, Orchard Books

2010

You..., Templar Publishing

Me..., Templar Publishing

I Love Bugs, Orchard Books (nominated for 2011 Kate Greenaway Medal)

Dot and Dash are Dressing Up, Scholastic Corporation

Dot and Dash Go To Bed, Scholastic Corporation

Dot and Dash Learn To Count, Scholastic Corporation

Desert Discovery, Campbell Books

Jungle Hide and Seek, Campbell Books

2009

I Don't Want a Cool Cat, Orchard Books

Miaow said the Cow, Templar Publishing (shortlisted for the 2009 Booktrust Early Years Awards)

Dot and Dash Love To Play, Scholastic Corporation

Dot and Dash Find a Friend, Scholastic Corporation

Dot and Dash Learn to Share, Scholastic Corporation

Dot and Dash Eat their Dinner, Scholastic Corporation

Dot and Dash Make and Do, Scholastic Corporation

Dot and Dash at the Beach, Scholastic Corporation

Messy Fingers, Campbell Books

2008

I Don't Want a Posh Dog, Orchard Books

Little Croc, Campbell Books

Little Pup, Campbell Books

Best Bear, Gullane Books

2007

I thought I saw a Dinosaur, Templar Publishing

Sometimes..., Templar Publishing

When..., Templar Publishing

2006

What Pet to Get?, Templar Publishing (shortlisted for the 2006 Booktrust Early Years Awards)

Awards 
Booktrust Early Years Awards 2010, I Love My Mummy (Orchard Books, written by Giles Andreae)
Peter's Picture Book of the Year 2013 Cinderelephant (Templar Publishing)

References

External links 
 Orchard Books about Emma Dodd
 Emma Dodd personal website
 Emma Dodd and Harper Collins
 Emma Dodd Blog
 /Emma Dodd and Nosy Crow

1969 births
Living people
People educated at Tormead School
English children's writers
English illustrators
British children's book illustrators
People from Surrey
Alumni of the University of the Arts London
British women illustrators
British women children's writers